Scriba may refer to:

 Scriba, New York
 the Latin word scriba meaning scribe or scrivener
 Scriba (ancient Rome), a public notary or clerk of the ancient Roman government
 people with the surname Scriba
Ludwig Gottlieb Scriba (1736–1804), German theologian and entomologist
Julius Karl Scriba (1848–1905), German surgeon
Christoph Scriba (b. 1929), German historian of mathematics
 Serranus scriba, the painted comber